Joseph G. Rosa (November 20, 1932 – January 17, 2015) was a writer of Western history, notable for his many publications about Wild Bill Hickok. Rosa's book, They Called Him Wild Bill: The Life and Adventures of James Butler Hickok, was published in 1964 and is considered to be the first authentic biography of Wild Bill Hickok, and was accepted by historians as the definitive work on the subject.

Family
Joseph G. Rosa was born November 20, 1932, in West London, England and grew up in Woodville Gardens, Ruislip, Middlesex. From an early age, Rosa loved movies, and especially Westerns, a passion that he shared with his father.

Career
Joseph G. Rosa's first job was as a copywriter for a firm that printed postage stamps and bank notes for the United Kingdom. He served in the Royal Air Force Signals, stationed in the United Kingdom and in Malta during the 1956 Suez Crisis. Rosa spent much of his career working in the communications industry, retiring in 1999. Throughout his over 50-year career as an historian, researcher and author, he compiled over 25 books and many articles for historic publications. He was wary of the glamorization  Joseph died at age 82 on January 17, 2015, in Ruislip, England.

Opinion on personalities of The American Old West in print 
Rosa stated "that a biography of a character like Jim Miller or John Wesley Hardin is justified on reputation and a list of killings. I don't agree. People like Hickok, Masterson or Tilghman and to some extent, perhaps, Earp in some way contributed toward the expansion of the United States, whereas the Hardins, Jesse Jameses retarded things."

Publications
 Some shooting, Mr. Hickok! - By Joseph G. Rosa, 1958
 They Called Him Wild Bill: The Life and Adventures of James Butler Hickok - By Joseph G. Rosa, 1964
 Alias Jack McCall, a pardon or death?: An account of the trial, petition for a Presidential pardon, and execution of John McCall for the murder of Wild Bill Hickok - By Joseph G. Rosa; Westerners, 1967
 The Gunfighter: Man or Myth? - By Joseph G. Rosa, 1969
 Wild Bill Hickok, Peacemaker - By Joseph G. Rosa, 1973
 The Pleasure of Guns: The Intricate and Beautiful Work of Famous Gunsmiths - By Joseph G. Rosa; Robin May, 1974
 Colonel Colt, London: The History of Colt's London Firearms, 1851-1857 - By Joseph G. Rosa, 1976
 An Illustrated History of Guns and Small Arms - By Joseph G. Rosa; Robin May, 1976
 Gun Law: A Study of Violence in the Wild West - By Joseph G. Rosa; Robin May, 1977
 Gunsmoke: A Study of Violence in the Wild West - By Joseph G. Rosa; Robin May, 1977
 J.B. Hickok, Deputy U.S. Marshal - By Joseph G. Rosa, 1979
 The West of Wild Bill Hickok - By Joseph G. Rosa, 1982
 An Illustrated History of Guns and Small Arms - By Joseph G. Rosa; Robin May, 1984
 Guns of the American West - By Joseph G. Rosa, 1985
 Colt revolvers and the Tower of London - By Joseph G. Rosa, 1988
 Rowdy Joe Lowe: Gambler With a Gun - By Joseph G. Rosa; Waldo E Koop, 1989
 Buffalo Bill and His Wild West: A Pictorial Biography - By Joseph G. Rosa; Robin May, 1989
 Wild Bill - By Joseph G. Rosa, 1992
 The Taming of the West: Age of the Gunfighter: Men and Weapons on the Frontier, 1840-1900 - By Joseph G. Rosa, 1993
 Age of the Gunfighter: Men and Weapons on the Frontier, 1840-1900 - By Joseph G. Rosa, 1995
 Wild Bill Hickok: The Man and his Myth - By Joseph G. Rosa, 1996
 Jack McCall, Assassin: An Updated Account of his Yankton Trial, Plea for clemency, and Execution - By Joseph G. Rosa; English Westerners Society, 1999
 Wild Bill Hickok, Gunfighter: An Account of Hickok's Gunfights - By Joseph G. Rosa, 2003
 Wild Bill Hickok: Sharpshooter and U.S. Marshal of the wild West - By Joseph G. Rosa, 2004
 Wild Bill Hickok, Gunfighter: An Account of Hickok's Gunfights - By Joseph G. Rosa, 2013

References

External links
 Worldcat Overview & works, Joseph G.Rosa
 Wild Bill and the Englishman, at True West Magazine
 Joseph G. Rosa, Author, at True West Magazine

Western (genre) writers
1932 births
2015 deaths